Bowie Municipal Airport  is a city-owned public airport in Bowie, Montague County, Texas, United States, located approximately  northeast of the central business district. The airport has no IATA or ICAO designation.

Facilities 
 Runway 17/35: 3,603 x 60 ft. (1,098 x 18 m), Surface: Asphalt

For the 12-month period ending 7 December 2017, the airport had 2,850 aircraft operations, an average of 8 per day: 98% general aviation and 2% military. At that time there were 27 aircraft based at this airport: 93% single-engine, 4% multi-engine, and 4% helicopter, with no jets, ultralights or gliders.

Accidents and incidents 
 15 August 2014: A Cessna 414, registration number N127BC, was on approach to land when it suddenly went into a spin and impacted the ground in a nose-down attitude. The aircraft was consumed in an immediate post-impact fire and the pilot and single passenger were killed. An autopsy of the pilot revealed acute, premortem, nonocclusive thrombosis of the left anterior descending coronary artery, and the medical examiner concluded that "[the pilot] died primarily to hypertensive and atherosclerotic cardiovascular disease and that his multiple blunt force injuries likely contributed to his death." The accident was attributed to "The pilot's incapacitation in flight as the result of an acute cardiac event, which resulted in a loss of control and collision with terrain."

References

External links 
 
  at Texas DOT Airport Directory

Airports in Texas
Transportation in Montague County, Texas